Waringsford is a small village in County Down, Northern Ireland, 6 km south east of Dromore. It is situated within Banbridge District. In the 2001 Census it had a population of 129 people. The village, despite the lack of services, has seen substantial property development in the last five years, helped by its rural setting, relative tranquility and close proximity to the A1.

The village lies within the townland of Tullinisky, in the civil parish of Garvaghy, within the barony of Iveagh Lower, Lower Half. It also lies in Banbridge District.

People 
Betsy Gray, distinguished in the Irish Rebellion of 1798, may have been born on the outskirts of Waringsford.

See also 
List of villages in Northern Ireland
List of towns in Northern Ireland

References 

Villages in County Down
Civil parish of Garvaghy
Banbridge District Council